New Brunswick is an unincorporated community in Harrison Township, Boone County, in the U.S. state of Indiana.

History
New Brunswick was laid out in 1850. A post office was established at New Brunswick in 1858, and remained in operation until it was discontinued in 1901.

Geography

References

Unincorporated communities in Boone County, Indiana
Unincorporated communities in Indiana
Indianapolis metropolitan area